The 2011 IIHF World Championship was the 75th IIHF World Championship, an annual international men's ice hockey tournament. It took place between 29 April and 15 May 2011 in Slovakia. The games were played in the Orange Arena in Bratislava, and the Steel Aréna in Košice. The Czech team was the defending champion.

This was the first time the independent Slovakia hosted the World Championships. However, this was the third time that Bratislava co-hosted the World Championships. The first two times were 1959 and 1992, each time with Prague, and while part of Czechoslovakia.

Finland won the gold medal after beating Sweden in the final 6–1. This was the second title for Finland.

Tournament format
The tournament is divided into four stages. The preliminary round, qualification round and relegation round use a round-robin format with each team playing every other team in its group once. The winner of a game in regulation time will earn 3 points, with the loser earning zero points. The winner of a game decided in overtime or in a shootout will be awarded 2 points, with the loser getting one point. Teams in the preliminary round are divided into four groups of four teams each; the last-place team in each group moves to the relegation round while the remainder move to the qualification round. The qualification round is divided into two groups of six teams each with the top four teams in each group moving to the playoff round. Games played in the preliminary round against teams in the same qualification round group count for the qualification round standings; therefore, teams who were previously in the same Preliminary round group do not play each other again in the qualification round. The relegation round is a single group of four teams with the bottom 2 teams being relegated to Division I of the World Championships. The tournament concludes with the playoff round, which is an 8-team tournament, to determine the winners of the gold, silver and bronze medals.

In the event of a tie in points at the conclusion of the preliminary, qualification or relegation rounds, the following tie-breaker format will be used:
 Points earned in games against tied teams
 Goal differential in games against tied teams
 Highest number of goals in games against tied teams
 Repetition of steps 1, 2 and 3, in order, including results against the next closest ranked team to the tied teams
 Repetition of step 4, including the next closest ranked teams one at a time
 2010 IIHF World Ranking

Rosters

Each team's roster for the 2011 IIHF World Championship consists of at least 15 skaters (forwards, and defencemen) and 2 goaltenders, and at most 20 skaters and 3 goaltenders. All sixteen participating nations, through the confirmation of their respective national associations, had to submit a roster by the first IIHF directorate meeting on 28 April 2011.

Summary

Preliminary round

The first gameday in Group A started with an upset, when Germany went on to win 2–0 against Russia after goals from Thomas Greilinger in the second period and Patrick Reimer, who decided the game with a goal two minutes before the final horn. It was the first win for the German team over Russia in a World Championship and the first one since the 1994 Winter Olympics in Lillehammer. After the second gameday, the group was decided in the outcome who advances and who would battle against relegation. Germany pulled another surprise victory over host Slovakia; after being down 4–0, Slovakia started a comeback but could only cut the deficit to one, losing by a final of 4–3. Germany was the group winner and advanced alongside Slovakia and Russia into the second round, while Slovenia finished fourth and went to the relegation round. The last time Germany won a preliminary round group was 78 years ago, in 1933.

Group B saw the first overtime of the tournament in a game between Switzerland and France. Julien Vauclair scored the decisive goal after 1:46 minutes played in overtime. Canada defeated Switzerland after overtime to capture first place, while France won against Belarus to go through to the qualifying round and sent Belarus to the relegation round.

In Group C, Sweden played against Norway and it was a back-and-forth game. Sweden went up 3–1 in the first period, but Norway fought back and at the end it was 4–4 after 60 minutes. The overtime went scoreless and so it went into a shootout; Per-Åge Skrøder scored on the first try for Norway and Eriksson missed on the first for Sweden and so Norway won 5–4, making it their first win against the Scandinavian rival in World Championship history. Sweden and the US team both got their second wins as the United States came back from being down 0–2 to win 4–2 against Norway. On the last gameday, Sweden captured the top seed in the group after a 6–2 win over the USA. Norway followed those two in the qualifying round after a 5–0 win over Austria, who found themselves in the relegation round.

Group D saw two wins from the respective favorites at the start: Finland and the Czech Republic. The picture was the same on the second game day, though Finland needed a shootout against Latvia to win 3–2. Jarkko Immonen scored the game-winning goal. Denmark needed a win over Latvia to advance and they got one after a shootout; 3–2 was the end result, Latvia then saw themselves facing the relegation.

Qualifying round
Every game in Group E was close, each was decided by one goal. The Czech team was still perfect after their fifth win, defeating Russia 3–2. Alongside them, Germany, Russia and Finland qualified for the quarterfinals and the Czech team was set to win the group with one more game to play. The host Slovakia was eliminated after losing to Finland 1–2. After the last game day, the Czech team was still perfect after winning 5–2 against Germany.

In Group F, Canada and Sweden played each other to determine the group winner, and the United States also qualified for the quarterfinals. Switzerland and Norway played for the last spot in the final round as Norway will face France which are already eliminated before their last game. Switzerland won 5–3 against the United States but they were still eliminated because Norway defeated France 5–2 to advance to the quarterfinals.

Relegation round
After two game days in Group G every team had three points and so the last two games determined the two teams going down and the two that remained in the top division for the next year. Slovenia faced Belarus, while Latvia played against Austria. Belarus crushed Slovenia into the Division A with a 7–1 win to stay in the top division. Austria joined Slovenia in the second division after losing against Latvia 1–4.

Playoff round

Quarterfinals

The quarterfinals started with the undefeated Czech Republic against Team USA. The United States started off better but Jaromír Jágr scored for the Czechs to take a 1–0 into the first intermission. Jágr scored the second goal during a 5 on 3 power play after a strong shot from the right side. The third goal came after a good combination over the whole ice leading to a goal by Tomáš Plekanec. Jágr became the man of the match after he scored his third goal four minutes before the end during another power play and the game ended in a comfortable 4–0 win for the Czech Republic.

In the evening game, Sweden took on Germany and scored the first goal in the first minute by Martin Thörnberg. Germany came right back and tied the game after two minutes as Alexander Barta was credited with the goal. Both teams had chances during the first period but Sweden took the 2–1 lead into the intermission. In the second period Sweden went up 4–1 before Germany came closer by going 2–4 in the last break. Sweden scored a goal in the last period which was disallowed because a whistle occurred before the goal was scored, however Thörnberg scored his second goal of the night shortly after and Sweden won 5–2 at the end. Both, Thörnberg and Berglund were credited with three points.

Day two of the quarterfinals started with a Nordic matchup as Finland faced Norway. After a scoreless opening period, Norway took the lead after Ken André Olimb scored on a penalty shot. Five minutes later, Finland had the lead after two quick goals. Jarkko Immonen scored his second goal to give Finland a two-goal lead before Jani Lajunen scored to make it 4–1 for the Finnish squad. Three of those four goals were scored during a power play. The third and last period went scoreless again and so Finland won 4–1, Mikael Granlund scored two points in the game alongside Immonen.

The last game of the quarterfinal round brought up a rivalry between Russia and Team Canada. Jason Spezza seemed to be the hero after he scored the first goal after 25 minutes and the lead held into the last period, when Alexei Kaigorodov went on his way to score the equalizer shorthanded, he went by two defenders to put the puck high into the Canadian net. Three minutes later, Ilya Kovalchuk scored to give Russia the lead. Canada pulled the goalie with a minute to go but they did not score, and Russia won the game 2–1.

Semifinals

The first semifinal was the matchup between the favourite and defending champion, the Czech Republic against Sweden. After the first period went scoreless Patrik Eliáš brought the lead to the Czechs after just 46 seconds into the second period. Sweden struck back twice with goals from Patrik Berglund and Mikael Backlund to take a one-goal lead into the last intermission. Jimmie Ericsson and Marcus Krüger scored to increase Sweden's lead to 4–1. Six minutes before the end, Eliáš scored his second goal and the Czechs gained hope again. They pulled their goaltender with under a minute to go but Sweden's Berglund scored an empty net goal. The Czech Republic was eliminated and Sweden advanced to the final with a 5–2 win.

In the evening game of the semifinals Finland played against Russia. Despite having a so-so tournament so far the Russian team qualified for this late stage of it. Konstantin Barulin was again the goaltender instead of Evgeni Nabokov and the first period ended scoreless. Mikael Granlund scored an airhook goal to take the Finnish team into a 1–0 lead in the second period. The goal has been noted by multiple media outlets worldwide as the finest goal in the tournament, and as one of the finest in the history of international hockey. In the last period Jani Lajunen scored the second goal before Immonen decided the game with the 3–0 goal, assisted by Granlund. Both players received their second point in the game.

Bronze medal game
The Czech Republic took on Russia for the bronze medal. The first period was a wild one ending in a 3–2 advantage for the Russian team while Ilya Kovalchuk scored two goals. The second period belonged to the Czech team after Petr Průcha scored his second point and Roman Červenka his second goal in the game. After the lead grew to 5–3 Vladimir Tarasenko brought Russia back into the game making it a one-goal game before the last period. After Jan Marek scored to make it 6–4, the Russian team pulled their goalie with two minutes to go. The Czech's Tomáš Plekanec scored an empty net goal to decide the game and give the Czech Republic the bronze medal after winning 7–4.

Gold medal game

The gold medal game was played between Sweden and Finland at the Orange Arena on 15 May.

After a goal-less first period, Sweden opened the game with a 1–0 goal by Magnus Pääjärvi in the second period at 27:40. Seven seconds before the period's end, Finland's Jarkko Immonen scored to tie the game 1–1. Finland took the lead early in the third period, scoring two goals at 42:35 and 43:21 by Nokelainen and Kapanen. Sweden took a time-out before the last period's half but did not manage to regroup, and the tournament was decided by a clear 6–1 victory to Finland by Janne Pesonen's, Mika Pyörälä's and Pihlström goals.

Host selection
Four nations, all located in Europe placed formal bids to host the 2011 IIHF World Championship. Those nations were:

 Slovakia
 Sweden
 Hungary
 Finland

Finland withdrew from bidding before voting began in order to apply for the 2012 World Championship. Finland and Sweden would both later win respective bids to host in 2012 and 2013, but this decision was later changed instead for the two Nordic countries to be joint hosts of the 2012, and 2013 IIHF World Championship editions.

After one round of voting, the winning bid was announced by IIHF president René Fasel on 19 May 2006, at the delegates congress of the International Ice Hockey Federation in Riga, Latvia. Slovakia's bidding cities received 70 votes, followed by the Swedish bid cities of Stockholm, and Gothenburg with 20 votes, and finally the Hungarian bid with 14 votes. The required 50% of the vote had been attained in the first round, which finalized Slovakia's successful bid.

Ivan Gašparovič, the President of Slovakia, was instrumental in Slovakia winning its successful bid, as he came in person to the delegates congress in Riga to endorse his country's bid, and convince the IIHF delegates of the viability of Slovakia. Gašparovič is himself an avid hockey fan and past vice-president of the Slovak Extraliga team, HC Slovan Bratislava.

Voting results

  withdrew from the 2011 bid prior to the start of the congress, postponed 2012.

Promotions

Official song
Song Life is a Game by Slovak singer Kristina was officially released on 18 March.

Mascot
Goooly is the official mascot of the tournament. Goooly is a Gray wolf, and Igor Nemeček, the 2011 IIHF World Championship general director, said he was chosen because: "Wolves are animals which are typically Slovak, evoking our forests and countryside". Over 14,000 entries were submitted for a national contest to name the mascot organized in association with Radio Expres and the Slovak Ice Hockey Federation. It is a word-play on the Slovak words for goal, and/or goals. Goooly, the mascot, was subjected to considerable ridicule in the English-speaking world because "gooly" is a well known slang term for a testicle.

Motto
Slovenská republika. Hokejová republika. (Slovak Republic. Hockey Republic).

Ambassadors
The official ambassadors of the 2011 IIHF World Championship Slovakia are Slovak hockey players Peter Bondra, Zdeno Chára, Marián Gáborík, Ľubomír Višňovský, Pavol Demitra, Jozef Stümpel, Marián Hossa, Miroslav Šatan and Slovak President Ivan Gašparovič.

Venues

The Orange Arena in Bratislava, also known as the Ondrej Nepela Arena, was substantially upgraded for the championship, in line with IIHF, Slovak, and international specifications, largely funded by the Slovakian government. Construction began on 23 April 2009 and was completed on 30 November 2010. More than €65 million ($90 million USD) was spent to install a new roof, modernize facilities, build two new adjacent practice arenas, and bring the seating from 8,350 to 10,000. The Steel Aréna, also known as the Ladislav Troják Arena, which was newly constructed in 2006, had a new €11 million practice rink built adjacent, between April 2009 and February 2010 for the World Championship legacy of future hockey development in Slovakia. The stadium would have the name Orange Arena, but only for the time of World Championship 2011 29 April 2011 to 15 May 2011

Both arenas were known by their Slovak honorific titles during the 2011 World Championship to correspond with IIHF neutral non-inclusive sponsorship rules. (Samsung Arena as the Ondrej Nepela Arena, and Steel Aréna as the Ladislav Troják Arena.)

As Ondrej Nepela Arena
As Ladislav Troják Arena

Nations
The following 16 nations qualified for the elite-pool tournament. 14 nations from Europe, and two nations from North America were represented.

Europe

North America

Seeding and Groups

The seeding in the preliminary round was based on the 2010 IIHF World Ranking, which ends at the conclusion of the 2010 IIHF World Championship. The 2010 Olympics were included. The teams were grouped accordingly by seeding (in parenthesis is the corresponding world ranking):

Group A 
 (1)
 (8)
 (9)
 (19)

Group B 
 (2)
 (7)
 (10)
 (15)

Group C 
 (3)
 (6)
 (11)
 (14)

Group D 
 (4)
 (5)
 (12)
 (13)

Preliminary round
Sixteen participating teams were placed in the following four groups. After playing a round-robin, the top three teams in each group advanced to the qualifying round. The last team in each group competes in the relegation round.

Groups A and D played in Bratislava, and groups B and C played in Košice.

Group A 

All times are local (UTC+2).

Group B 

All times are local (UTC+2).

Group C 

All times are local (UTC+2).

Group D 

All times are local (UTC+2).

Qualifying round 
The top three teams from each group of the preliminary round advanced to the qualifying round. They were placed into two groups: teams from Groups A and D were placed into Group E, while teams from Groups B and C were placed into Group F. Every team kept the points from preliminary round matches against teams who also advanced. The teams played a single round robin, but didn't play against teams that they had already met in preliminary groups.

The top four teams in both groups E and F advanced to the playoff round.

Group E 

All times are local (UTC+2).

Group F 

All times are local (UTC+2).

Relegation round 
The bottom team in the standings from each group of the preliminary round plays in the relegation round. The bottom two teams in the relegation round move down to Division 1 for the 2012 World Championship.

Group G 

All times are local (UTC+2).

Playoff round

Quarterfinals 

All times are local (UTC+2).

Semifinals 
All times are local (UTC+2).

Bronze medal game 
Time is local (UTC+2).

Gold medal game 
Time is local (UTC+2).

Ranking and statistics

Tournament awards
Best players selected by the directorate:
 Best Goaltender:  Viktor Fasth
Best Defenceman:  Alex Pietrangelo
Best Forward:  Jaromír Jágr
Most Valuable Player:  Viktor Fasth
Media All-Star Team:
Goaltender:  Viktor Fasth
Defence:  David Petrasek,  Marek Židlický
Forwards:  Patrik Berglund,  Jarkko Immonen,  Jaromír Jágr,

Final standings

The final standings of the tournament according to IIHF:

Scoring leaders
List shows the top skaters sorted by points, then goals. If the list exceeds 10 skaters because of a tie in points, all of the tied skaters are shown.
GP = Games played; G = Goals; A = Assists; Pts = Points; +/− = Plus/minus; PIM = Penalties in minutes; POS = PositionSource: IIHF.com

Leading goaltenders
Only the top five goaltenders, based on save percentage, who have played 40% of their team's minutes, are included in this list.
TOI = Time On Ice (minutes:seconds); SA = Shots against; GA = Goals against; GAA = Goals against average; Sv% = Save percentage; SO = ShutoutsSource: IIHF.com

Officials
The IIHF selected 16 referees and 16 linesmen to work the 2011 IIHF World Championship. They are the following:

Referees
 Vladimír Baluška
 Vyacheslav Bulanov
 Darcy Burchell
 Antonín Jeřábek
 Danny Kurmann
 Christer Lärking
 Eduards Odiņš
 Konstantin Olenin

Referees
 Peter Ország
 Sami Partanen
 Sören Persson
 Daniel Piechaczek
 Brent Reiber
 Jyri Rönn
 Vladimír Šindler
 Thomas Sterns

Linesmen
 Roger Arm
 Chris Carlson
 Paul Carnathan
 Ivan Dedioulia
 Jiří Gebauer
 Manuel Hollenstein
 Matjaž Hribar
 Kiel Murchison

Linesmen
 Milan Novák
 Andre Schrader
 Sirko Schulz
 Anton Semionov
 Sergei Shelyanin
 Jussi Terho
 Christian Tillerkvist
 Miroslav Valach

IIHF broadcasting rights

Trailer
A trailer was created for the World Championship which is entitled: Slovak Republic becomes the Hockey Republic!. The trailer starts with ice and snow gradually covering Slovakia and ends with Slovak hockey players jumping onto the ice and shooting a puck. The player who shoots has the number 38 on his hockey jersey, the same as the Slovak legend Pavol Demitra. It features the Slovak countryside, and Trojične square, in Trnava. It took a 70-man film crew, more than 100 extras, several 3D animators, and the support of the Slovak Tourist Board.

Online
For the first time in an IIHF World Championship, a YouTube channel was created to promote the Slovakia 2011 tournament. A video campaign was launched on this YouTube website which featured the christening of the mascot Goooly, updates on the construction work of the arena's, and the status of general preparations.

An official Facebook page was also created for the championship, being only the second tournament to do so, after the previous championship in Germany. Its 10,000th "fan" was awarded a prize by the tournaments organizing committee.

See also

 2011 World Junior Ice Hockey Championships
 2011 Women's World Ice Hockey Championships
 2011 IIHF World U18 Championships
 2011 IIHF World Women's U18 Championship

References

External links

Official website
Official Youtube channel of the 2011 IIHF World Championship 
Official Facebook page of the 2011 IIHF World Championship 
Slovak Hockey Federation official 2011 website 

 
IIHF World Championship
1
world
2011
April 2011 sports events in Europe
May 2011 sports events in Europe
Sport in Košice
Sports competitions in Bratislava
2010s in Bratislava
2010–11 in Slovak ice hockey